Viktor Nikolayevich Shamburkin (Виктор Николаевич Шамбуркин; 12 October 1931 – 11 May 2018) was a Soviet sport shooter and Olympic champion.

He won a gold medal in 50 m rifle 3 positions event at the 1960 Summer Olympics in Rome.

References

1931 births
2018 deaths
Soviet male sport shooters
ISSF rifle shooters
Russian male sport shooters
Olympic shooters of the Soviet Union
Shooters at the 1960 Summer Olympics
Shooters at the 1964 Summer Olympics
Olympic gold medalists for the Soviet Union
Sportspeople from Saint Petersburg
Olympic medalists in shooting
Medalists at the 1960 Summer Olympics